Montgomery Meigs "Monty" Atwater (1904–1976) was an American  avalanche researcher, forester, skier, and author. He is considered the founder of the field of avalanche research and forecasting in North America.

Early life 
In 1904, Atwater was born in Baker City, Oregon.

Education 
In 1926, Atwater earned an English Literature degree from Harvard College.

Career 
Atwater worked a number of jobs including football coach, cattle rancher, and trapper.  He lived in Montana in the 1930s and wrote short stories and mysteries, some under the pseudonym of Max Montgomery.

During World War II, Atwater served in the 10th Mountain Division as a winter warfare instructor. Atwater reached the rank of captain while in active combat duty and being wounded. Atwater was discharged due to his injury.

In autumn 1945, Atwater became a forest ranger for the Wasatch National Forest where he managed public safety in Little Cottonwood Canyon in Alta, Utah. Over the next two decades he established the first avalanche research center in the Western Hemisphere at Alta, inventing many of the techniques and much of the equipment needed for avalanche forecasting and control.

In 1960, Atwater served as the Avalanche Control Chief during the 1960 Winter Olympics in Squaw Valley, California. Atwater successfully preventing any major avalanches during the Games despite a history of huge chairlift-destroying avalanches there.

In 1960s, with Frank Parsoneault, Atwater   developed the Mark 10 Avalaunchers, a pneumatic cannon for launching avalanche control explosives.

In 1964, Atwater retired from the Forest Service.  In 1966, he repeated his masterful job of avalanche control at the alpine skiing World Championships in Portillo, Chile, where the ski area had been almost completely destroyed by massive avalanches only a year earlier but successfully held the Championships unscathed.  He also served as a consultant to ski areas, mining companies, and telecommunication companies throughout the mountainous regions of North and South America.

Atwater ran a small research lab in Squaw Valley.

Personal life 
In 1945, Atwater moved to Alta, Utah.

Atwater had three sons, James E. Atwater, Robert and Montgomery.

In 1976, Atwater died of a heart attack.

Awards 
 1973 Father of snow avalanche work in the United States. Named by National Ski Patrol, U.S. Forest Service and the National Park Service.
 1979 U.S. Ski and Snowboard Hall of Fame.

Bibliography
 General books

 Young Adult/Juvenile Fiction

References

External links
Guide to the Montgomery Atwater papers at the University of Oregon.
 Montgomery Meigs Atwater papers, 1955-1966 at orbiscade.org

1904 births
1976 deaths
American children's writers
Avalanche researchers
Harvard College alumni
United States Army personnel of World War II
People from Baker City, Oregon